Golartek is a village in Darus Salam Thana, Dhaka District, Bangladesh. According to the 2011 Bangladesh census, the population of the village was 5,262.

Geography 
Golartek is situated besides Turag River. Besides Sha Ali Thana to the west it is bounded by Savar Upazila.

References

Populated places in Dhaka Division
Villages in Dhaka District
Villages in Dhaka Division